Shadow Knights - The Shogun of Death (Also known as "Budo - The Art of Ninja Combat") is a platform game created by id Software and published by Softdisk in 1991. Shadow Knights was the first game created for Softdisk, who paid $5000 for it as part of id Software's contractual obligation to them. Shadow Knights was also marketed by Softdisk as part of "The Lost Game Collection of ID Software".

Plot
The prospering land of Naipusan falls under siege by warriors from the North led by the evil shogun Sashika. For many years Sashika grew in power and began learning dark magic. Some said that Sashika was possessed by the demon Kuskuro. In the wake of the never-ending reign of terror, a ninja born in the east whose arrival foretold by sages comes to remove Sashika from his seat of power and rule Naipusan fairly.

Gameplay
Shadow Knights is a basic platform game with many element similar to the NES Ninja Gaiden games. The player goes through nine levels, slaying enemies with both sword and magic stars and collecting powerups. The player has limited vitality and magic power to survive. The player can accumulate power by collecting magic orbs. The ninja has healing and weapon powers. Some level areas require the player to defeat a boss monster to progress.

Development
Development for Shadow Knights was being done in conjunction with Slordax: The Unknown Enemy around 1990. At the time Commander Keen in Invasion of the Vorticons was in development outside working hours with Softdisk. Tom Hall designed a few of the levels. The level maps were designed using a custom-made program called Tile Editor (TEd), which was first created for Dangerous Dave. The game engine that was built would soon be reused for Dangerous Dave in the Haunted Mansion.

References

External links
Official website

1991 video games
DOS games
DOS-only games
Id Software games
Video games about ninja
Platform games
Video games developed in the United States
Video games set in Japan
Softdisk
Japan in non-Japanese culture